Coleophora yomogiella is a moth of the family Coleophoridae. It is found in Japan, Korea and China.

The larvae feed on the leaves of Artemisia princeps and Artemisia montana. They create a light greyish ochreous tubular case. The case is clothed with minute felt.

References

yomogiella
Moths of Asia
Moths described in 1974